Jalan Johan Setia (Selangor state route B10) is a major road in Selangor, Malaysia.

List of junctions

References

Roads in Selangor